New York's 27th State Senate district is one of 63 districts in the New York State Senate. It has been represented by Democrat Brad Hoylman since 2013, following the retirement of fellow Democrat Thomas Duane.

Geography
District 27 covers much of Lower and Midtown Manhattan, including some or all of Greenwich Village, the East Village, Tribeca, Little Italy, Chinatown, Chelsea, Stuyvesant Town–Peter Cooper Village, Midtown, Times Square, Hell's Kitchen, and the Upper West Side.

The district overlaps with New York's 7th, 10th, and 12th congressional districts, and with the 65th, 66th, 67th, 73rd, 74th, and 75th districts of the New York State Assembly.

Recent election results

2020

2018

2016

2014

2012

Federal results in District 27

References

27